Lisker's sign is a clinical sign in which there is tenderness when the front, middle (anteromedial) part of the tibia is percussed. It can be found in people who have deep venous thrombosis.

References 

Symptoms and signs: Vascular